"This too shall pass" is a Persian adage translated and used in several languages. It reflects on the temporary nature, or ephemerality, of the human condition — that neither the bad, nor good, moments in life ever indefinitely last. The general sentiment is often expressed in wisdom literature throughout history and across cultures, but the specific phrase seems to have originated in the writings of the medieval Persian Sufi poets.

It is known in the Western world primarily due to a 19th-century retelling of Persian fable by the English poet Edward FitzGerald. It was also notably employed in a speech by Abraham Lincoln before he became the sixteenth President of the United States.

History
An early English citation of "this too shall pass" appears in 1848:

It was also used in 1852, in a retelling of the fable entitled "Solomon's Seal" by  the English poet Edward FitzGerald. In it, a sultan requests of King Solomon a sentence that would always be true in good times or bad; Solomon responds, "This too will pass away". On September 30, 1859, Abraham Lincoln recounted a similar story:

Origin of the fable
The fable retold by FitzGerald can be traced to the first half of the 19th century, appearing in American papers by at least as early as 1839. It usually involved a nameless "Eastern monarch". Its origin has been traced to the works of Persian Sufi poets, such as Rumi, Sanai and Attar of Nishapur. Attar records the fable of a powerful king who asks assembled wise men to create a ring that will make him happy when he is sad. After deliberation the sages hand him a simple ring with the Persian words "This too shall pass" etched on it, which has the desired effect to make him happy when he is sad.

This story also appears in the Jewish folklore. Many versions of the story have been recorded by the Israel Folklore Archive at the University of Haifa. Jewish folklore often casts Solomon as either the king humbled by the adage, or as the one who delivers it to another.

In some versions the phrase is simplified  even further, appearing as an acronym, only the Hebrew letters gimel, zayin, and yodh, which begin the words "Gam zeh ya'avor" (gam zeh yaavor), "this too shall pass."

See also
 Impermanence
 Memento mori
 Mono no aware
 Ozymandias
 Sic transit gloria mundi
 Ubi sunt
 Yorick

References

Adages
English phrases